Anatoli Grigoriévitch Novikov (– 24 September 1984) was a Soviet composer, a choral conductor and a political activist.

Background
Novikov was awarded two Stalin Prizes, in 1946 and 1948. In 1970 he was bestowed the title of People's Artist of the USSR, and in 1976 was awarded the title of Hero of Socialist Labour, and the Order of Lenin. He composed such widely popular songs as "Vasya-vasilyok" (1941), "Smuglyanka" (1943), "Rossiya" (1946), "Dorogi"/"Roads" (1946), "The Hymn of Democratic Youth of the World" (1947).

References

External links 
 

Soviet composers
Soviet male composers
Stalin Prize winners
People's Artists of the USSR
20th-century composers
Soviet conductors (music)
1896 births
1984 deaths
Burials at Kuntsevo Cemetery
20th-century conductors (music)
20th-century male musicians